The G1 Climax 30  was a professional wrestling tournament produced by New Japan Pro-Wrestling (NJPW). The tournament commenced on September 19 and concluded on October 18, 2020. It was the thirtieth edition of G1 Climax, and forty-sixth edition of the tournament counting its previous forms under different names. A Block winner Kota Ibushi defeated B Block winner Sanada in the final to win the tournament.

Considered NJPW's most important tournament, the G1 Climax features twenty wrestlers, divided in two blocks of ten ("A" and "B"). Each participant faces all nine other wrestlers within the same block in singles matches. The winner of each block is determined via a point system, with two points for a win, one point for a draw, and no point for a defeat; each night of the event sees the ten members of one block compete for the tournament. On the final day of the event, the winners of both blocks face each other to determine the winner of the G1 Climax, who will gain a future match for the IWGP Heavyweight Championship at Wrestle Kingdom, NJPW's biggest yearly event.

Production

Tournament rules 
The tournament features twenty wrestlers, divided in two blocks of ten ("A" and "B"). Each participant faces all nine other wrestler within the same block in singles match, with the winner of each block being determined via a point system, gaining two points for a win, one point for a draw, and no point for a loss; each night of the event sees the ten members of a same block compete for the tournament. In case of several wrestler sharing the top score, the results of the matches those wrestlers had when facing each others in the tournament act as tiebreaker, with the one having the most wins over the other top-scorers determining the winner of the block.

On the final day of the event, the respective winners of both blocks face each other to determine the winner of the G1 Climax, who would gain a future match for the IWGP Heavyweight Championship, NJPW's top championship, at Wrestle Kingdom, NJPW's biggest yearly event; if the IWGP Heavyweight Champion himself wins, he gets to pick his opponent at Wrestle Kingdom. The Young Lion matches have a fifteen-minutes time limit, while the matches of the tournament have a 30-minutes time limit (with the time limit being reached resulting in a tie); the final match between the two block winners has no time limit.

History 
In January 2020, NJPW announced that the 2020 edition of the G1 Climax would take place from September to October, instead of its usual July–August schedule, to avoid conflict with the 2020 Summer Olympics. During the New Japan Road event on September 9, NJPW announced the full tournament bracket for the G1 Climax.

Storylines 
The event includes matches that result from scripted storylines, where wrestlers portray heroes, villains, or less distinguishable characters in scripted events that build tension and culminate in a wrestling match or series of matches.

The tournament saw the in-ring returns of Juice Robinson and Will Ospreay to NJPW for the first time since the COVID-19 pandemic began. Jay White, Jeff Cobb, and Kenta returned to NJPW in August on their weekly TV show, NJPW Strong, which was taped in America. However, this tournament was White, Cobb, and Kenta's returns to Japan since the start of the pandemic.

Venues

Results

Night 1 (A Block) 
The first night of A Block took place on September 19, 2020 at the Osaka Prefectural Gymnasium in Namba, Osaka.

Tournament scores

Night 2 (B Block) 
The first night of B Block took place on September 20, 2020 at the Osaka Prefectural Gymnasium in Namba, Osaka.

Tournament scores

Night 3 (A Block) 
The second night of A Block took place on September 23, 2020 at the Hokkaido Prefectural Sports Center in Toyohira-ku, Sapporo.

Tournament scores

Night 4 (B Block) 
The second night of B Block took place on September 24, 2020 at the Hokkaido Prefectural Sports Center in Toyohira-ku, Sapporo.

Tournament scores

Night 5 (A Block) 
The third night of A Block took place on September 27, 2020 at the World Memorial Hall in Chūō-ku, Kobe.

Tournament scores

Night 6 (B Block) 
The third night of B Block took place on September 29, 2020 at Korakuen Hall in Bunkyo, Tokyo.

Tournament scores

Night 7 (A Block) 
The fourth night of A Block took place on September 30, 2020 at Korakuen Hall in Bunkyo, Tokyo.

Tournament scores

Night 8 (B Block) 
The fourth night of B Block took place on October 1, 2020 at City Hall Plaza Aore Nagaoka in Nagaoka, Niigata.

Tournament scores

Night 9 (A Block) 
The fifth night of A Block took place on October 5, 2020 at the Takamatsu City General Gymnasium in Takamatsu, Kagawa.

Tournament scores

Night 10 (B Block) 
The fifth night of B Block took place on October 6, 2020 at the Hiroshima Sun Plaza in Nishi-ku, Hiroshima.

Tournament scores

Night 11 (A Block) 
The sixth night of the A Block took place on October 7, 2020 at the Hiroshima Sun Plaza in Nishi-ku, Hiroshima.

Tournament scores

Night 12 (B Block) 
The sixth night of the B Block took place on October 8, 2020 at Zip Arena Okayama in Okayama, Okayama.

Tournament scores

Night 13 (A Block) 
The seventh night of A Block took place on October 10, 2020 at the Osaka Prefectural Gymnasium in Namba, Osaka.

Tournament scores

Night 14 (B Block) 
The seventh night of B Block took place on October 11, 2020 at the Aichi Prefectural Gymnasium in Nagoya, Aichi.

Tournament scores

Night 15 (A Block) 
The eighth night of A Block took place on October 13, 2020 at the Hamamatsu Arena in Hamamatsu, Shizuoka.

Tournament scores

Night 16 (B Block) 
The eighth night of B Block took place on October 14, 2020 at the Yokohama Budokan in Kanagawa-ku, Yokohama.

Tournament scores

Night 17 (A Block Final) 
The ninth night of A Block took place on October 16, 2020 at the Ryogoku Kokugikan in Sumida, Tokyo. Kota Ibushi was declared the winner of A Block after Tomohiro Ishii pinned Jay White.

Tournament scores

Night 18 (B Block Final) 
The ninth night of B Block will take place on October 17, 2020 at the Ryogoku Kokugikan in Sumida, Tokyo. Sanada was declared the winner of B Block after pinning Evil.

Tournament scores

Night 19 (Final) 
The final night took place on October 18, 2020 at the Ryogoku Kokugikan in Sumida, Tokyo. A Block winner Kota Ibushi defeated B Block winner Sanada to be declared the winner of the tournament.

Participants

Aftermath 
On night 17, during the match between Kazuchika Okada and Will Ospreay, Bea Priestley, Ospreay's girlfriend, made her debut appearance in NJPW, at ringside. As Okada locked his Money Clip submission onto Ospreay, Priestley attempted to enter the ring, distracting the referee in the process, allowing Tomoyuki Oka to make his return to the company as Great O-Kharn (later changed to Great O-Khan, in reference to Genghis Khan of the Mongol Empire), attacking Okada with an Eliminator, helping earn the victory for Ospreay. Afterwards, Ospreay turned heel on Okada by attacking him after the match from behind with his Hidden Blade elbow. In a backstage interview, Ospreay announced that he would officially leave Chaos to start a new faction with him, Priestley, and O-Khan called The Empire (later changed to United Empire).

On November 7, 2020, Kota Ibushi unsuccessfully defended his briefcase, being the first man to do so, by losing it to Jay White at Power Struggle.

Notes

References

External links 

 G1 Climax official website 

New Japan Pro-Wrestling tournaments
New Japan Pro-Wrestling shows
2020 in professional wrestling
September 2020 events in Japan
October 2020 events in Japan